Berden is a village in Essex, England, UK.

Berden may also refer to:

People

Surname
 Ben Berden (born 1975), Belgian racing cyclist
 Martijn Berden (born 1997), Dutch footballer
 Tommy Berden (born 1979), Dutch squash player

Given name
 Berden de Vries (born 1989), Dutch racing cyclist

Other uses
 Berden Hall, Berden, Essex, England, UK; a country house
 Berden Priory, Essex, England, UK

See also

 
 Burden (disambiguation)